Government Medical College,Baramulla (Urdu: گورنمنٹ میڈیکل کالج برامولا, Koshur: سرکآرؠ طبؠ ژاٹھَل ۄورمۄل), also known as GMC Baramulla, is a full-fledged tertiary referral Government Medical college located in the Kanthbagh area of Baramulla. It was established in the year 2018. The college imparts the degree Bachelor of Medicine and Surgery (MBBS). Nursing and para-medical courses are also offered. The college is affiliated to University of Kashmir and is recognized by National Medical Commission. The hospital associated with the college is the largest hospital in the North Kashmir. It caters to the whole population of North Kashmir and part of Central Kashmir. OPD of the Associated hospital receives nearly 4000 patients on daily basis. GMC Baramulla has also Maternity and Paediatric Hospital associated with it, which is located a few kilometers away from the main campus. Urban Primary health center Old Town Baramulla and Primary health center Kalantra are also associated with it to impart clinical teaching to students. Selection to the college is done on the basis of merit obtained in the NEET National Eligibility and Entrance Test. Yearly undergraduate student intake cpaacity is 100 from the year 2018.

Courses
Government Medical College, Baramulla undertakes education and training of students MBBS courses. This college is offering 100 MBBS seats from 2019 of which 85% are UT Quota and 15 % are all India quota.From 2020-21, institution has also started Post MBBS DNB and Post MBBS Diploma programmes.

See also
GMC Anantnag
GMC Rajouri

References

External links 
 http://gmcbaramulla.com

2018 establishments in Jammu and Kashmir
Educational institutions established in 2018
Medical colleges in Jammu and Kashmir
Colleges affiliated to University of Kashmir